Keld Gantzhorn Knudsen (born 3 October 1954) is a Danish former footballer and manager.

Career
Gantzhorn played for Odense, and appeared for the team in the 1978–79 European Cup on 27 September 1978 against Bulgarian club Lokomotiv Sofia, which finished as a 1–2 away loss. He later began coaching, and was the manager of the Denmark women's national team from 1988 until 1996. He coached the team at the 1991 FIFA Women's World Cup, 1995 FIFA Women's World Cup and 1996 Summer Olympics.

Under the leadership of Keld Gantzhorn, the team won a bronze medal during the European Championships in Denmark in 1991 by winning 2–1 over Italy in the match of 3–4. place, after losing to Norway in the semifinals after rematch and penalty shootout.
Likewise, the team won a bronze medal at the European Championships in Italy in 1993 by beating the defending European champions Germany 3–1. Here too, Denmark had lost the semifinal to Norway 1–0.

In addition to the national coaching job for women, Gantzhorn coached male teams from OB (U-18), Od. KFUM, Næsby and Dalum.

Personal life
He studied to become a teacher, and currently works at the Hjalleseskolen in Odense. He lives in the  district of Odense with his wife Rita, and has four children.

References

External links
 
 
 Keld Gantzhorn coach profile at Soccerdonna.de 
 Keld Gantzhorn coach profile at DBU.dk

1954 births
Living people
People from Nordfyn Municipality
Danish men's footballers
Odense Boldklub players
Danish 1st Division players
Association football midfielders
Danish football managers
Women's association football managers
Denmark women's national football team managers
1991 FIFA Women's World Cup managers
1995 FIFA Women's World Cup managers
Danish schoolteachers
Sportspeople from the Region of Southern Denmark
Coaches at the 1996 Summer Olympics